FC Augsburg II is the reserve team of the German association football club FC Augsburg from the city of Augsburg, Bavaria, whose first team play in the Bundesliga.

The team, which has never played above the fourth tier, had its greatest success in 1977, when it won the local Schwaben Cup, qualified for the German Cup and reached the third round of the competition, going out to Hertha BSC Berlin.

The side plays as an under-23 team.

History
The club's reserve side can trace its roots back to the pre-merger BC Augsburg Amateure, which had its greatest success when it played for a season in the southern division of the Amateurliga Bayern in 1962–63. A sixth place there allowed the side to qualify for the unified Bavarian league the following year but, along with the decline of the senior team, the reserve side got relegated too, finishing 17th.

In the post-merger era, the team disappeared into the lower amateur leagues after that but returned to the Landesliga Bayern-Süd in 1976, finishing runners-up in the league in its first season, now as FC Augsburg Amateure. By 1978 however, the side was relegated again, not to return to this level for a quarter of a decade. It did however take out the Schwaben Cup in 1977 and qualified for the first round of the 1977–78 German Cup. After away victories over second division side Arminia Hannover and fellow amateur club 1. FC Normannia Gmünd in the first two rounds, the team reached the third round, where it lost 0–4 to Hertha BSC Berlin. Incidentally, the senior team was knocked out in the same round, too, losing to TSV 1860 München.

After becoming a founding member of the Bezirksoberliga Schwaben in 1988, the team was withdrawn at the end of the season, disbanded altogether and not reformed for more than a decade.

After 2004 the side once more played in the Landesliga Bayern-Süd again, generally achieving good results but not managing another promotion, with a second place in 2012 as its best result. The team was one of two clubs in the league to apply for a licence in the new tier four Regionalliga Bayern. Taking part in the promotion play-off, FCA II advance past Bayernliga clubs SB/DJK Rosenheim and FC Schweinfurt 05 to play in the Regionalliga from 2012. The club was thereby also able to win promotion from the sixth tier to the fourth without playing in the fifth.

In the 2012–13 season the club had to struggle against relegation all season and beyond, having to defend its league place in the relegation round with the Bayernliga runners-up. In a two-leg play-off against BC Aichach FCA II defended its league place with an aggregate score of 5–2. The following season was much more successful for the team, finishing fourth in the Regionalliga. After two better seasons with a fourth place in 2014 as its best result Augsburg had to enter the relegation play-off once more in 2015–16 but successfully defended its league place against TSV 1860 Rosenheim.

Current squad

Honours
The team's honours:

League
 Landesliga Bayern-Süd (IV)
 Runners-up: 1977, 2012
 Bezirksoberliga Schwaben (VI)
 Champions: 2004
 Bezirksliga Schwaben-Nord (V)
 Champions: 1976
 Bezirksliga Schwaben-Süd (VII)
 Champions: 2003

Cup
 Schwaben Cup
 Winners: 1977
 Runners-up: (2) 1983, 2007

Recent managers
Recent managers of the club:

Recent seasons
The recent season-by-season performance of the club:

With the introduction of the Bezirksoberligas in 1988 as the new fifth tier, below the Landesligas, all leagues below dropped one tier. With the introduction of the Regionalligas in 1994 and the 3. Liga in 2008 as the new third tier, below the 2. Bundesliga, all leagues below dropped one tier. With the establishment of the Regionalliga Bayern as the new fourth tier in Bavaria in 2012 the Bayernliga was split into a northern and a southern division, the number of Landesligas expanded from three to five and the Bezirksoberligas abolished. All leagues from the Bezirksligas onwards were elevated one tier.

Key

DFB Cup appearances
The team has qualified for the first round of the German Cup just once:

References

Notes

Citations

Sources
 Grüne, Hardy (2001).  Vereinslexikon. Kassel: AGON Sportverlag 
 Die Bayernliga 1945–97  DSFS, published: 1998
 Horst Eckert, Werner Klinger (2007)  Augsburger Fussball-Geschichte.

External links
 Official team site  
 FC Augsburg II on Weltfussball.de  
 Das deutsche Fußball-Archiv  historical German domestic league tables
 Manfreds Fussball Archiv  Tables and results from the Bavarian amateur leagues

Football clubs in Germany
Bavarian reserve football teams
Association football clubs established in 1969
Football in Swabia (Bavaria)
1969 establishments in West Germany
 
German reserve football teams

de:FC Augsburg#Zweite Mannschaft (U23)